Escape from Iran: The Canadian Caper is a Canadian-American television film from 1981 about the "Canadian Caper"  during the Iranian Revolution and hostage crises.

Cast

See also
Argo (2012 film)

References

External links

American drama television films
1981 television films
1981 films
Iran hostage crisis
Iranian Revolution films
Canadian drama television films
English-language Canadian films
Films set in Iran
Films shot in Toronto
Films set in 1979
Films set in 1980
Films about Canada–United States relations
Films directed by Lamont Johnson
1980s American films
1980s Canadian films